Sin vagina, me marginan is a 2017 Peruvian comedy-drama film written, directed and produced by Wesley Verástegui in his directorial debut. The film stars the model Javiera Arnillas and the singer Marina Kapoor, being the first Peruvian film in the history of this country that has transsexual people as its main characters.

Synopsis 
Barbie (Javiera Arnillas) is a prostitute transgender who needs operation to fulfill her dream of being a full woman and conquer a childhood sweetheart. For this he needs about 30,000 dollars, which is unaffordable for her. Together with her best friend, Microbe (Marina Kapoor), they devise a plan to get the necessary money for surgery: kidnapping Pamela (Caterine Solorzano ), the daughter of transphobic Minister for Women and Vulnerable Populations.

Cast 
The actors participating in this film are:

 Javiera Arnillas as Barbie
 Marina Kapoor as Microbe
 Caterine Solórzano as Pamela

Production 
After being nominated in 2015 for the best unpublished script at the International Festival of New Latin American Cinema of Cuba and in 2016 being in the quarterfinals of the Joplin Award of the BlueCat Screenplay Competition and Short Film Festival, Verástegui decided to write the script for what would be his first film. With a budget of 5,000 dollars he produced and directed the film which was shot entirely with a mobile device iPhone 6. Filming lasted eight days, locating the scenes in various districts of the city of Lima. The cast is made up of amateur actors and actresses, friends and family members of the production.

Release 
In Peru, the title of the film was censored after complaints from several parents, so it could not be released to the public as scheduled for September 28, 2017, in movie theaters. Even so, it was successfully released on November 9, 2017, at the III Film Week of the University of Lima. On April 12, 2018, the film was finally released to the public through a streaming platform, Indie, which chose Verástegui's film to inaugurate the platform. In Spain it was released on November 3, 2017, at the 22nd LesGaiCineMad. After that, the film was acquired by Filmin.

Awards

References

External links 

 

2017 films
2017 comedy-drama films
2017 LGBT-related films
2017 independent films
Peruvian comedy-drama films
Peruvian LGBT-related films
Tragicomedy films
2010s Peruvian films
2010s Spanish-language films
Films set in Peru
Films shot in Peru
2017 directorial debut films
Films about prostitution
Films about kidnapping
Films about trans women